In Case of Fire are an alternative rock band from Portadown, Northern Ireland, who formed in 2005. The band officially disbanded on 1 October 2012, and then reunited in March 2016. The original line-up consisted of lead vocalist and guitarist Steven Robinson, bassist Mark Williamson and drummer Colin Robinson. Their musical style has been described as "alternative rock" with "progressive" and "hardcore" influence, and they have been compared to Muse, Queens of the Stone Age and Mars Volta. Critics have specifically praised the band's use of unusual time signatures. They are signed to Search and Destroy Records in the UK and the Zomba Label Group in the United States.

The trio won the MTV2 'Spanking New' competition, coming out on top of such acts as Adele, Foals, Black Kids and Lykke Li to be the "viewer's choice of bands to watch out for in 2008". They were the opening act on the 2009 Kerrang! tour supporting Bring Me the Horizon, Black Tide, Dir en grey and Mindless Self Indulgence, after receiving high praise from editor Paul Brannigan. He had said that the three-piece were "the best new band I’ve heard in ages". On 28 March 2009, the band supported Fightstar and Bullet for My Valentine at the Royal Albert Hall, in London for a special Teenage Cancer Trust show, after replacing The Blackout due to illness.

The band released their debut album, Align the Planets in May 2009 which received strong reviews from the alternative  music press. Later, in August 2009 they won the Kerrang! Award for "Best British Newcomer".

Second album (2010–2012) 
At the end of April 2010, the band advertised an 'early album version' of "Burn the Bridges" on bandcamp. Their latest single, "Are You Ready?", and its b-side, is available as a free download at their bandcamp site.

The band announced via Facebook on 1 March that they had split from Raw Power Management, following several failed attempts to get the recording of a second album off the ground in the last year and a half, which had led the band to question its own existence. In the following month, demos of new songs "Pretender" and "The Reason" were placed on the band's Facebook page. In April 2011 it was announced via Facebook that Mark Williamson had left the band. The following November it was announced that Colin Robinson had also left the band. In October 2012, lead vocalist/guitarist Steven announced via Facebook that ICOF had come to an end.

Members
Former members
Steven Robinson – lead vocals, guitars, lyrics (2005–2012)
Mark Williamson – bass guitar, (2005–2011)
Colin Robinson – drums, percussion (2005–2011)

Touring members
Thomas Camblin – drums, percussion (2011–2012)

Discography

Studio albums
 Align the Planets (2009)

Singles

Awards

References

External links
Official Website (expired)
Bebo
In Case of Fire Interview on Spoonfed
In Case of Fire interview with getcloser.com

Musical groups established in 2005
British musical trios
British progressive rock groups
Alternative rock groups from Northern Ireland
British post-hardcore musical groups
PIAS Recordings artists
Zomba Group of Companies artists
Kerrang! Awards winners